Pravets or Pravetz (also transliterated as Pravec) is a town in Pravets Municipality in central western Bulgaria, located approximately  from the capital Sofia. Pravets is home town of Pravetz computers.

Pravets has a population of 4,512 people. Mountains surround it, which allows for a mild climate with rare winds. In the outskirts there is an artificial lake used for fishing and recreation. The town is the birthplace of Bulgaria's longtime communist president Todor Zhivkov. The first microprocessor factory in Bulgaria established in Pravets. The computers produced there,  which were among the first in Bulgaria, were named Pravetz.

Today, the town is most famous for its computers and technology systems high school and the RIU golf resort complex. There is also a language high school by the name of Aleko Konstantinov. It prepares many students who continue their undergraduate education in Bulgaria, England, the US, Germany, and France. The Professional Computing and Technology Systems high school is one of two technical schools in Bulgaria, which prepares students for the Technical University in Sofia, Bulgaria, and allows for direct admission to the university to its top students.

Gallery

External links

  Professional High School of Computing and Technology Systems (UKTZ, УКТЦ)
 Country&Golf in the area
 Image Gallery of Pravets
  Large Image Gallery of Pravets and the Region

Towns in Bulgaria
Populated places in Sofia Province